Billboards is a ballet commissioned by Gerald Arpino for the Joffrey Ballet featuring the works of Prince. The premiere was on Wednesday, January 27, 1993, at Hancher Auditorium, University of Iowa, Iowa City.

No new music was used, although Prince contributed a special extended ten-minute orchestrated version of "Thunder" from the Diamonds and Pearls album. A video of the performance was released on VHS in February 1994, and on Laserdisc format.

Acts

I: Sometimes It Snows in April 
Choreographed by Laura Dean.
"Sometimes It Snows in April"
"Trust" / "Baby I'm a Star"

II: Thunder 
Choreographed by Charles Moulton.
"Thunder"
"Purple Rain"

III: Slide
Choreographed by Margo Sappington.
"Computer Blue"
"I Wanna Melt with U"
"The Beautiful Ones"
"Release It" (by The Time)/ "Computer Blue" (Reprise)

IV: Willing & Able
Choreographed by Peter Pucci.
"For You"
"The Question of U"
"It"
"Willing and Able" / "Gett Off"

References

Ballets to the music of Prince (musician)
1993 ballet premieres